The Barron Building is an eleven-storey office tower located at 610 8th Avenue Southwest in Calgary, Alberta, Canada. Designed by architect Jack Cawston and built between 1949 and 1951, it is one of Canada's foremost examples of Art Moderne-style architecture. In 2003 it was named by the Alberta Association of Architects as Significant Alberta Architecture.

History and design

Following the discovery of Leduc No. 1 on 13 February 1947, the city of Calgary quickly became an international oil centre. During the ensuing boom, many oil companies sought to establish offices in the city. To capitalize on the necessity of downtown office space, Calgary businessman and lawyer Jacob Bell Barron (1888-1965) hired local architect Jack Cawston (1911-1967), with the firm Cawston and Stevenson, to design a modern office tower. At the time, modernism was rare in Calgary, a colonial city dominated by neoclassical architecture. The few preceding examples of modernism in the city include the Utilities Building at 115 6th Avenue Southwest (1939), the Alberta Government Telephones Building at 119 6th Avenue South West (1929), the Dmitri Skaken House at 1131 Colborne Crescent South West (1947), and the Glenmore Water Treatment Plant at 5300 19th Street Southwest (1933). The Barron cost $1.25 million, was built by Larwill and Stevenson Construction Company, and opened in 1951. Original tenants included Sun and Halliburton oil companies. From 1955 to 1969 the building was known as the Mobil Oil Building.

The first three stories of the building hold the Uptown Theatre, which includes a mezzanine level. This is followed by seven floors of office space. On the roof is a penthouse that was lived in by Barron. The penthouse was expanded in the late 1950s to cover the whole area of the roof, save for a balcony in the southwest corner. The Barron is primarily clad in buff-coloured brick. The central bay as well as the second and third floors are clad in Tyndall limestone, while the ground floor is in polished black marble. The building also features ribbon windows, a design brought to prominence by Le Corbusier.

Decline and current status

In 2007 the building was purchased by real estate company Strategic Group. After years of decline, the final tenant, the Uptown Theatre, left the building in November 2011. In June 2012 the Barron was placed on the "Top Ten Endangered Places List" by the Heritage Canada Foundation. In April 2014, Alberta Culture moved to declare the building a provincial historic resource, which would disallow alteration to the exterior. In July 2014, however, after protests from the owner, the province rejected the proposal for protection, thus allowing future redevelopment.

In September 2015 Strategic Group intends to commence redevelopment. The process will see a new glass tower added on the east side of the building (on the current site of the historic Bank of Montreal Building), the demolition of the Uptown Theatre, which will be converted into retail space, and the removal of the marquee.

References

Historic buildings in Calgary